Senapathy "Kris" Gopalakrishnan is an Indian billionaire businessman who is recognized as a global business and technology thought leader for his role in growing the IT services industry worldwide. He co-founded Infosys, where he served as the chief executive officer and managing director from 2007 to 2011, and as vice chairman from 2011 to 2014. Following his retirement from Infosys, Kris has been very active in promoting the Indian startup ecosystem, and philanthropically supporting research on brain sciences, aging related disorders, and healthcare in India. He has also been on the board of trustees for the Infosys Science Foundation from 2009, and currently serves as the President of the Board. According to Forbes,He has an estimated net worth of US$4.60 Billion (Rs.35,000 Crores) as of December,2021 making him one of the richest people in India.

In January 2011, the Government of India awarded Kris Gopalakrishnan the Padma Bhushan, the country's third-highest civilian honour. He was voted the top CEO (IT Services category) in Institutional Investor's inaugural ranking of Asia's Top Executives and selected as one of the winners of the second Asian Corporate Director Recognition Awards by Corporate Governance Asia in 2011. He also was selected to Thinkers 50, an elite list of global business thinkers, in 2009. He is an active contributor to industry - having served as the President of India's apex industry chamber Confederation of Indian Industry (CII) in 2013–14, and as one of the co-chairs of the World Economic Forum in Davos in January 2014.

He actively shapes the technology and startup ecosystem through a myriad of roles. Kris is the chairman of Axilor Ventures, an early stage startup accelerator and venture fund. He is also the chairman of itihaasa Research and Digital, a not-for-profit think-tank focused on the evolution of technology domains in India. He serves on the Board of Governors of Okinawa Institute of Science and Technology (OIST) and is the chairman, Board of Governors of IIIT, Bangalore. He is the chairman of the Vision Group on Information Technology of Karnataka Government and the chairman of CII Centre of Excellence for Innovation, Entrepreneurship and Start-ups.

Early days 
Kris Gopalakrishnan was born in Thiruvananthapuram, Kerala on 5 April 1955. He studied at the Government Model Boys Higher Secondary School.

Kris Gopalakrishnan obtained an MSc (physics) in 1977 and MTech (computer science) in 1979, both from IIT, Madras. He started his career as a software engineer with Patni Computer Systems, Mumbai, in 1979.

Net Worth 
He has a net worth of US$4.60 Billion(Rs.35,000 Crores) as of December,2021 according to Forbes magazine making him one of the richest people in India.

In 2007, Gopalakrishnan took over as CEO and managing director of Infosys Technologies Limited. During his 4-year tenure, Infosys' top-line doubled to $6 billion. Gopalakrishnan previously served as chief operating officer (since April 2002), and as the president and joint managing director (since August 2006). His responsibilities included customer services, technology, investments and acquisitions. He was later appointed executive vice-chairman of Infosys's board. He served as non-executive vice chairman of Infosys's board from 14 June till 10 October 2014.

Other work 
In 2014 Gopalakrishnan co-founded Axilor Ventures, an early stage startup accelerator and venture fund. Axilor has the No 1 rated program for early stage startups and the largest partner network of VCs in India.

In 2016, Kris Gopalakrishnan founded itihaasa Research and Digital, a think-tank focused on the evolution of technology domains in India such as AI, brain sciences and digital transformation. itihaasa's flagship project is chronicling the six decades of the evolution of the history of Indian IT.

Positions
Kris Gopalakrishnan has served in leadership roles in several research/educational and industry / startup institutions and forums.

Positions in Research / Educational institutions and bodies

1)    Chairing the governing board of India's INR 3,660 crore National Mission on Cyber-Physical System Technologies

2)    Board of Governors of Okinawa Institute of Science and Technology

3)    Chairman, Board of Governors of IIIT, Bangalore

4)    Member of DBT/Wellcome Trust India Alliance's Strategic Advisory Council

5)    Nanyang Professor of the Practice at NTU, Singapore from 1 June 2018

6)    Trustee of the Infosys Science Foundation

Positions in Industry / Government institutions and bodies

7)    Chairman of Vision Group on IT for Government of Karnataka

8)    President of CII (2013–14)

9)    Co-chair of the World Economic Forum in Davos (2014)

10)  Member of the United Nations Global Compact Board (2012–15)

11)  Chairperson of India's committee on Non-Personal Data Governance

12)  The first Chairperson of the Reserve Bank Innovation Hub

13)  Chairman of CII Centre of Excellence for Innovation, Entrepreneurship and Start-ups and former chairman of CII Start-up Council

14)  Chairs the advisory committee for IIT Gandhi Nagar Research Park and Incubation Cell, Gujarat

15)  Chairs the advisory council for Entrepreneurship Development Institute, Gandhi Nagar, Gujarat

16)  Chief mentor of Startup Village

Awards and honours
1)    In 2011, Government of India awarded him with Padma Bhushan which is India's third highest civilian honour

2)    Fellow of Indian National Academy of Engineers

3)    Honorary Fellow of Institution of Electronics and Telecommunication Engineers of India

4)    Conferred with an honorary doctorate by University of Kerala in 2019

5)    Top CEO by Institutional Investor (2011)

6)    Thinkers 50 (2009)

7)    Distinguished Alumnus Award, IIT Madras (1998)

8)    Member of ACM, IEEE and IEEE Computer Society

Philanthropy - Support for Research and Entrepreneurship in India 
Kris is supporting and guiding several world-class India focused initiatives, through his leadership roles in various Government committees / bodies and philanthropic initiatives, in the following areas:

1.         Brain Science and Computer Science

Kris has contributed Rs. 225 crores (approximately US$40 million) to develop a Centre for Brain Research at the Indian Institute of Science in Bangalore. He is the donor of the largest philanthropic gift ever received by the 105-year-old institute from an individual. He has contributed an additional Rs. 60 crores (approximately US$10 million) to set up distinguished visiting chairs in Neurocomputing and Data Science at the Indian Institute of Science of Bengaluru and Indian Institute of Technology Madras of Chennai.

Kris is chairing the governing board of India's INR 3,660 crore National Mission on Cyber-Physical System Technologies which is overseeing the establishment of 25 hubs related to CPS and allied technologies.

2.         Healthcare

Kris has furthered Ageing research in India through the Srinivasapura Aging Neuro Senescence and Cognition Study, and GenomeIndia, a pan-India initiative focused on Whole Genome Sequencing of 10,000 individuals from representative populations across India. He is also supporting the Accelerator Program for Discovery in Brain Disorders using Stem Cells at the National Centre for Biological Sciences in Bangalore, Karnataka.

He is on the Board of Swasth Digital Health Foundation, a not-for-profit consortium charting an innovative healthcare model in India.

3.         Nurturing the Indian research and innovation ecosystem

Kris instituted the Gopalakrishnan – NTU Presidential Postdoctoral Fellowships, focused on Industry 4.0, Smart Cities.

He supports young researchers in India through the Pratiksha Trust Young Investigators Award at IISc, Pratiksha Trust Scholarship and travel grants for Winter Schools on Quantitative Systems Biology at ICTS, and the Young Faculty Recognition Award and Travel Grants at IIT Madras.

Kris established the Gopalakrishnan – Deshpande Centre for Innovation and Entrepreneurship at IIT Madras in August 2017, to be able to solve India's society's problems by applying the full capabilities of the scientific and technological knowledge of Indian academic institutions through world class innovation and entrepreneurship.

4.         Creating social impact and rediscovering Indian science / technology

Kris supports the nurturing of livelihoods of farmers through programs like the Naandi Foundation and Centre for Collective Development.

He has supported several interesting history projects – such as the 'History of Indian IT' through itihaasa.com and a research project on 'History of Mathematics in India' at IIT Gandhinagar.

References

Tamil billionaires
Living people
1956 births
Businesspeople from Thiruvananthapuram
Recipients of the Padma Bhushan in trade and industry
IIT Madras alumni
Infosys people
Indian computer scientists
20th-century Indian physicists
Scientists from Kerala
Recipients of the Rajyotsava Award 2010